Pringy is a commune in the Seine-et-Marne department in the Île-de-France region in north-central France. As of 2018, the population was reported as 2,894.

Demographics
The inhabitants are called  Pringyaciens.

Pringy is twinned with the English town of Pucklechurch, near Bristol.

See also
Communes of the Seine-et-Marne department

References

External links

1999 Land Use, from IAURIF (Institute for Urban Planning and Development of the Paris-Île-de-France région) 

Communes of Seine-et-Marne